The 2003 Gran Premio Telmex-Gigante was the seventeenth round of the 2003 CART World Series season, held on October 12, 2003 at the Autódromo Hermanos Rodríguez in Mexico City, Mexico.

Qualifying results

Race

Caution flags

Notes 

 New Race Record Paul Tracy 1:56:51.396
 Average Speed 100.133 mph

External links
 Full Weekend Times & Results

Mexico City
Gran Premio Telmex-gigante, 2003
Gran Premio Tecate